Sevran Beaudottes is an RER station in Sevran, Seine-Saint-Denis, a northeastern suburb of Paris. It is on RER B between Villepinte and Aulnay-sous-Bois.

References

External links

 

Railway stations in Seine-Saint-Denis
Réseau Express Régional stations
Paris Métro line 16